Westfield Annapolis is a shopping mall, owned by Unibail-Rodamco-Westfield and is located near the junction of U.S. Route 50 and Interstate 97 in Parole, near Annapolis, Maryland. As of 2022, the mall features the traditional tenants Macy's and JCPenney, and prominent specialty stores Free People, Intimissimi, Janie & Jack, and Crate & Barrel.

History
The site was at one time the location of the Annapolis terminus of the Washington, Baltimore and Annapolis Electric Railway, and was known as the "Best Gate" station, which had three single-ended and four double-ended sidings, where rail cars could be shunted on or off of the single-track WB&A east–west railway which ran to the north–south Baltimore and Ohio Railroad and Pennsylvania Railroad lines. This "Best Gate" station gave the name to the nearby Bestgate Road, which today runs along the northern perimeter of the mall.

A free-standing, single-level Montgomery Ward store occupied the site during the 1970s. Following the construction and opening of a single-level mall on the site in 1980, Montgomery Ward became an anchor.  Additional anchor stores included Washington, D.C.-based Garfinckel's and Hecht's, both with two levels. The mall was expanded in 1983 with the addition of a single-level JCPenney. Garfinckel's closed in 1990 after the company went bankrupt. The mall was expanded again in 1994 with the addition of a two-level Nordstrom store as well as an expanded food court. In 1998 a two-level Lord & Taylor store opened which was followed by the opening of an 11-screen movie theater. The Montgomery Ward store closed in 2001 and in 2002 was replaced with a Sears store. Hecht's became Macy's in September 2006. Another large addition to the mall was completed in 2007, which included an expansion of the existing JCPenney store.

The former Garfinckel's space once housed a two-level Borders Books and Music store which operated during the mid-2000s until its closure in 2011. A two-level Forever 21 store now occupies the space. Nordstrom added on in 1994.

The late 2010s saw multiple classic chain anchors retreat from brick and mortar after being disrupted by digital retailers in recent years.

In August, 2017 it was announced Lord & Taylor would shutter. Westfield announced its space would be reconstructed into additional stores including The Container Store.

In April 2018, Anne Arundel County Public Library opened a temporary branch called "Discoveries: the Library at the Mall", in Westfield Annapolis. It moved to a permanent location in the former American Eagle and Charlotte Russe stores in February 2020. Since July 2021, the library includes a Community Pantry where staff distribute diapers, baby supplies, hygiene items and menstrual supplies weekly.  

On May 7, 2020, Nordstrom, which maintains several additional outposts, announced it would shutter during a wave of secondary store closures.

The SPCA of Anne Arundel County, which opened an animal shelter called "Paws at the Mall" at Westfield Annapolis in September 2020, says it is the only such shelter in the U.S. that is located within a mall.

On April 12, 2022, AMC Theatres announced the acquisition of seven Bow Tie Cinemas locations, including their location at Westfield Annapolis. The theater reopened as AMC Annapolis Mall 11 on the weekend of April 21, 2022.

2006 shooting
On Saturday, November 18, 2006, an off duty United States Secret Service agent was at the mall when he witnessed a fight in progress in the food court. During the attempt to break up the fight, one of the combatants pulled a gun and fired at the agent, wounding him. The agent returned fire, hitting the shooter twice. A third person was wounded in the altercation. A Midshipman from the U.S. Naval Academy ran toward the sound of gunshots and provided first aid for the Secret Service agent. That Midshipman later received the Navy and Marine Corps Achievement Medal. The mall was closed shortly after the incident, with all patrons asked to leave over the public address system. The associated trial lasted until December 2007 and the shooter was sentenced to 65 years in prison.

Current anchors
JCPenney (since 1983)
AMC Theatres (since 2022)
Macy's (since 2006)
Crate & Barrel (since 2009)
Forever 21 (since 2013)
The Container Store (since 2021)

Former anchors
Montgomery Ward (1980–2001)
Hecht's (1980–2006)
Garfinckel's (1980–1990)
Nordstrom (1994–2020)
Lord & Taylor (1998–2020)
Borders Books and Music (2001–2011)
Sears (2002–2020)
Bow Tie Cinemas (1998–2022)

References

External links
Official Westfield Annapolis Website

1980 establishments in Maryland
Buildings and structures in Annapolis, Maryland
Shopping malls established in 1980
Shopping malls in Maryland
Tourist attractions in Annapolis, Maryland
Annapolis